Scott Smith (born 21 July 1995) is a Scottish footballer who plays as a midfielder for Jeanfield Swifts in the East of Scotland Football League. Smith began his career with Dundee United and has also played for Forfar Athletic, Airdrieonians, Elgin City and Broughty Athletic. He also plays futsal for PYF Saltires and represents the Scotland national futsal team.

Early life and career
Smith was born in Perth and played for Longforgan Boys Club with future teammate Scott Fraser, before joining the Dundee United youth system. Youth coach Ian Cathro rated him as highly as Dundee United's most promising talents Ryan Gauld and John Souttar. He continued to impress and went on to sign a professional contract in June 2011.

Playing career
Smith made his first team debut as a late substitute against Heart of Midlothian in March 2014. Soon after, he signed a contract extension to keep him at the club until 2016 and again made a late appearance for the first team against Aberdeen.

On 6 November 2014, Smith joined Forfar Athletic on loan until January 2015. He made his debut on 8 November 2014, in a 2–0 defeat against Greenock Morton.

On 26 August 2015, Smith signed on loan for Airdrieonians until January 2016. After returning from Airdrie, Smith was released by Dundee United in February 2016. In March 2016, Smith returned to Forfar Athletic, signing a short-term contract. He left Forfar at the end of the 2015–16 season, signing for Elgin City in July 2016.

Smith left Elgin in 2018 and joined Dundee-based junior football club Broughty Athletic, where he played alongside his brother Fraser. Both brothers then transferred to East of Scotland League club Jeanfield Swifts in November that year.

Smith also plays futsal for Perth-based PYF Saltires, with whom he won the Scottish Super League in 2019. He represents the Scotland national futsal team, having been called up for the 2017 Home Nations Championship.

Career statistics

References

External links
 

Living people
1995 births
Footballers from Perth, Scotland
Scottish footballers
Association football midfielders
Scotland youth international footballers
Dundee United F.C. players
Forfar Athletic F.C. players
Airdrieonians F.C. players
Elgin City F.C. players
Scottish Professional Football League players
Broughty Athletic F.C. players
Jeanfield Swifts F.C. players
Scottish Junior Football Association players
Scottish men's futsal players